Ronald Maurice Cahill (1915-1992) was a National Football League quarterback for the Chicago Cardinals.

He was signed by the Cardinals as a replacement for Bud Schwenk, who had joined the armed forces. In his only National Football League season, Cahill led the league in interceptions but did not win any of the ten games in which he played.

In 1946, Cahill signed with the Buffalo Bisons of the newly formed All-America Football Conference, but did not appear in any games.

References

1915 births
1992 deaths
People from Leominster, Massachusetts
Sportspeople from Worcester County, Massachusetts
Players of American football from Massachusetts
American football halfbacks
American football quarterbacks
Holy Cross Crusaders football players
Chicago Cardinals players